The Cavanaughs is an American sitcom that aired on CBS from December 1, 1986 to July 27, 1989.

The series revolved around Francis "Pop" Cavanaugh, a 71-year-old, blue-collar Irish Catholic man living in South Boston with his daughter Kit and son Chuck, as well as Chuck's sons (one of whom was a Catholic priest) and daughter. Much of the show's humor stemmed from conflicts between the cantankerous, opinionated Pop and his grown children.

After airing during the 1986-87 TV season, the show went on hiatus and returned in the Summer of 1988.

Cast
Barnard Hughes as Francis "Pop" Cavanaugh
Christine Ebersole as Kit Cavanaugh
Peter Michael Goetz as Chuck Cavanaugh
John Short as Father Chuck Cavanaugh, Jr.
Mary Tanner Bailey as Mary Margaret Cavanaugh
Parker Jacobs as John Cavanaugh
Danny Cooksey as Kevin Cavanaugh
Art Carney appeared in three episodes as Pop's younger brother, Jimmy "The Weasel" Cavanaugh.

Episodes

Season 1 (1986–87)

Season 2 (1988–89)

References

External links

1980s American sitcoms
1986 American television series debuts
1989 American television series endings
CBS original programming
English-language television shows
Irish-American mass media
Religious comedy television series
Television series about families
Television series by CBS Studios
Television shows set in Boston